Boerhavia wrightii is a species of flowering plant in the four o'clock family known by the common name largebract spiderling. It is native to the deserts of the southwestern United States and northern Mexico, where it grows amongst desert shrubs. This is an annual herb producing a slender, spidery erect stem to about 70 centimeters in maximum length. The leaves are lance-shaped to oblong with rippled edges and roughly pointed ends. Most of the leaves grow near the base of the plant. The inflorescences appear at the ends of the slim stem branches. They bear a few pale pink flowers, each just a few millimeters long, with adjacent reddish or pinkish bracts.

External links
Jepson Manual Treatment
USDA Plants Profile
Flora of North America
Photo gallery

wrightii
Flora of the Southwestern United States
Flora of the South-Central United States
Flora of Northwestern Mexico
Flora of the California desert regions
Flora of the Sonoran Deserts
Natural history of the Colorado Desert
Natural history of the Mojave Desert
Flora without expected TNC conservation status